Miliakdjuin Island is an uninhabited island in the Qikiqtaaluk Region of Nunavut, Canada. It is located southeast of the Kikastan Islands in the Cumberland Sound, off Baffin Island's Cumberland Peninsula. Akulagok Island, Kekerten Island, Kekertukdjuak Island, Tesseralik Island, Tuapait Island, and Wareham Island are in the vicinity.

References

External links 
 Miliakdjuin Island in the Atlas of Canada - Toporama; Natural Resources Canada

Islands of Baffin Island
Islands of Cumberland Sound
Uninhabited islands of Qikiqtaaluk Region